MedLabNews is a UK quarterly science magazine aimed at scientists and science professionals. It made its first release in April 2008 and like its sister magazine Laboratory News, the magazine covers aspects of scientific discovery and advances in the laboratory sector. However MedLabNews also focuses closer on the medical, clinical and diagnostic fields of science.

MedLabNews has three websites associated with the publication. The MedLabNews and Laboratory News websites both feature News, features, comments, new products for the laboratory industry, opinion polls, jobs, and events. Lab News Pages allows users to search for products and services relevant to the laboratory industry.

Regular content
 News - Highlights from the past quarter in science;
 Editors comment - Personal insights into developments and trends;
 Features - Indepth articles on new methods, techniques, equipment and trends;
 Products - A directory of new products for the laboratory industry

References

External links
medlabnews.co.uk

Quarterly magazines published in the United Kingdom
Science and technology magazines published in the United Kingdom
Magazines established in 2008
Medical magazines